Visitors to Uganda must obtain a visa on arrival to Uganda or from one of the Ugandan diplomatic missions, unless they come from one of the visa exempt countries. All visitors must hold a passport valid for 6 months.

Visa policy map

Visa exemption 
Citizens of the following 36 countries and territories can visit Uganda without a visa for up to 3 months (unless otherwise noted):

Holders of diplomatic or service passports issued to nationals of India, Italy, Namibia, South Africa do not require a visa for 3 months. Visa exemption agreement for holders of diplomatic and official/service passports was signed with Ethiopia in August 2019, and it is yet to be ratified.

e-Visa
Uganda began issuing electronic visas (e-Visa) on 1 July 2016. Passengers who have been issued an e-visa must travel with a printed e-visa confirmation.

Visa on arrival
Citizens of all other countries except  may obtain a visa for Uganda on arrival. As of 22 July 2016, the price is US $50. Electronic visas are expected to replace the visa on arrival facility. As a temporary measure, passengers who have not applied for an e-visa on line, will still be able to apply for their e-visa on arrival in Uganda. However, facilities will be very limited and passengers may experience delays.Holders of consular, diplomatic, official, service or special passports of any country can obtain a visa on arrival for 3 months.

East African Tourist Visa
The 90-day East African Tourist Visa is also available on arrival, which is valid for Uganda, Kenya, and Rwanda if first used in the country that issued the visa. The fee for this visa is $100.

Somalia
Entry and transit is refused to  nationals if not holding a biometric passport, even if not leaving the aircraft and proceeding by the same flight.

See also

 Visa requirements for Ugandan citizens

References

Uganda
Foreign relations of Uganda